"All That I've Got" is a song recorded by British singer Rebecca Ferguson. Written by Rebecca Ferguson and Jarrad Rogers. It was released as a digital download in the United Kingdom on 2 March 2014 as the second UK single (third overall) from her second studio album Freedom (2013).

Track listing

Chart performance

Weekly charts

Year-end charts

Release history

References

Rebecca Ferguson (singer) songs
2014 singles
Songs written by Jarrad Rogers
Syco Music singles
2013 songs
Songs written by Rebecca Ferguson (singer)